Screams and Whispers is the fourth and final album by the American thrash/progressive metal band Anacrusis released in 1993.

Track listing
 "Sound the Alarm" (Kenn Nardi) – 5:36
 "Sense of Will" (John Emery, Nardi) – 4:49
 "Too Many Prophets" (Kevin Heidbreder, Nardi) – 5:26 
 "Release" (Nardi) – 4:16 
 "Division" (Heidbreder, Nardi) – 4:32 
 "Tools of Separation" (Emery, Nardi) – 6:19 
 "Grateful" (Nardi) – 5:13 
 "A Screaming Breath" (Emery, Nardi) – 4:15
 "My Soul's Affliction" (Emery, Nardi) – 4:29 
 "Driven" (Emery, Heidbreder, Nardi) – 5:48 
 "Brotherhood?" (Nardi) – 6:49 
 "Release (remix)" (Nardi) – 4:20

Credits
Band members
 Kenn Nardi – vocals, guitars
 Kevin Heidbreder – guitars
 John Emery – bass guitar
 Paul Miles – drums

Production
 Recorded 1992 at 48K Audio, St. Louis, Missouri
 Produced by: Kenn Nardi
 Engineered by: Dave "Fuzzy" Duirnak
 Cover concept: Anacrusis
 Computer manipulation and layout: Greg Schrameyer/Visual Imagineers
 Cover photos: Jennifer Horvath
 Live photos: Harry Pilkerton
 Logo design: Kevin Heidbreder
 Remixed January–February, at MusicHead Recording, Inc., Lake Geneva, Wisconsin
 Remixed by: Kenn Nardi
 Remix engineer: Bill Metoyer
 Assistant engineer: Patrick Murphy
 Mastered by: Eddie Shreyer at Future Disc

References

Anacrusis (band) albums
1993 albums
Albums free for download by copyright owner
Metal Blade Records albums